Konrad Ksawery Swinarski (4 July 1929, Warszawa - 19 August 1975 near Damascus) – Polish theatrical, television, film and opera director and stage designer.

He has created his own style, thanks to which he is considered one of the most original and outstanding artists in the history of Polish theatre.

Life 
His father was lieutnant colonel , and his mother was Irmgarda Liczbińska, who came from Polish-German Silesian family. During Warsaw studies he was an assistant to directors  and Erwin Axer. He finished studying in 1955, but graduated in 1972 based on A Midsummer Night's Dream production in National Stary Theatre. In 1973–1975 he was a lecturer of National Academy of Theatre Arts in Kraków.

During studies he became fascinated with Bertolt Brecht work. In 1954, together with Przemysław Zieliński he realized Señora Carrar's Rifles for New Warsaw's theatre.

He debuted solo by directing Żeglarz (The Sailor) by Jerzy Szaniawski, premiering 14 May 1955 in Wojciech Bogusławski  Theatre in Kalisz. In 1955–1957 he interned for Berliner Ensemble as Brecht's assistant. Together with other assistants he took part in finishing inscenization of Fear and Misery of the Third Reich, started by Brecht before his death on 14 August 1956.

Returning to Poland, Swinarski directed plays in Warsaw theatres: Dramatyczny, Współczesny, Ateneum and National Theatre and Gdańsk . He also directed plays abroad, eg in West Germany.

In 1960 he got Leon Schiller award, granted to young theatrical directors.

In 1965 he started his longtime cooperaion with Stary Theatre in Cracow, where some of his most famous works were produced. Those included his most famous work, novel and innovative inscenization of Dziady (Forefathers Eve) by Adam Mickiewicz, premiering 18 February 1973. 30 May 1974 premiered his inscenization of Wyzwolenie (Liberation) by Stanisław Wyspiański, his last work for Stary Theatre. 1975 Swinarski began preparations to direct Hamlet, interrupted by his sudden death.

Death 
19 August 1975 Swinarski died in ČSA Flight 540 accident of Ilyushin Il-62 that crashed during attempted landing near Damascus. Swinarski was invited by empress of Iran Farah Pahlavi to take part in Shiraz Arts Festival. There were plans for Swinarski to show his Dziady during next years festival. Swinarski was buried in Powązki Military Cemetery (quartier A37-4-4).

After his death, Teatr magazine established yearly , awarded to theatrical directors for best work of the season. The laureates include Henryk Tomaszewski, Jerzy Jarocki, .

Private life 
In 1955 Swinarski married Barbara Witek. His homosexuality was a well-known fact in artistic circles, but it wasn't publically mentioned (or in any biographical work) until 2003.

Awards and honors 
 1969 – Second Degree Award of the Minister of Culture and Art for creative research in the field of theatre staging;
 1973 – City of Kraków Award
 1974 –  First Degree State Award for outstanding achievements in the field of theatre directing
 1974 – „Drożdże” (Yeast), award of Polityka
 1974 – Knights Cross Order of Polonia Restituta
 Golden Cross of Merit

References

External links 
 Konrad Swinarski as remembered by Tadeusz Łomnicki (pl)

Knights of the Order of Polonia Restituta
Recipients of the State Award Badge (Poland)
Recipients of the Gold Cross of Merit (Poland)
Victims of aviation accidents or incidents in Asia
Burials at Powązki Military Cemetery
Polish theatre directors
Polish television directors
Polish film directors
Polish opera directors
Scenographers
Polish gay artists
1929 births
1975 deaths
Victims of aviation accidents or incidents in 1975